Shanghai Men's Volleyball Club, now known as Shanghai Golden Age, is a Chinese men's volleyball club based in Shanghai. The Shanghai men's volleyball team plays in the Chinese Men's League and the AVC Club Volleyball Championship.

The team won fifteen China League champion titles. The team with the name and different extensions have been presented as Shanghai Tang Dynasty and Fudan University Shanghai and now Shanghai Golden Age. Shanghai Volleyball Club has been a dominant force in the Chinese League since its inauguration in 1997, having won 15 titles in 23 editions to date, including recent five consecutive editions.

The team participated in FIVB Volleyball Men's Club World Championship for the first time in 2017.

2018–19 team roster

Honours
Chinese Volleyball League
Champions (16): 1999/00, 2003/04 – 2011/12, 2014/15 – 2019/20
Runners-up (4): 2002/03, 2013/14, 2020/21, 2022/23

AVC Club Volleyball Championship
Runners-up (1): 2012
Third place (3): 2001, 2005, 2011

Notable players
  Shen Qiong (1999–2013)
  Fang Yingchao (2001–2017)
  Ren Qi (2005–present)
  David Lee (2013–2014)
  Bojan Janić (2013–2014)
  Cristian Savani (2013–2016)
  Nikola Kovačević (2014–2015, 2016 (only for Asian Club Championship))
  Scott Touzinsky (2015–2016)
  Giulio Sabbi (2015–2016, 2018–present)
  György Grozer (2016–2017)
  Facundo Conte (2016–2018)
  Julien Lyneel (2017–2018)
  Krisztián Pádár (2018) only for the finals of Season 17/18
  Klemen Čebulj (2018–2019)
  Tine Urnaut (2019–2020)
  Osmany Juantorena (2022–present)
  Bartosz Bednorz (2022–present)

Head coaches
Note: The following list may not be complete.
  Shen Fulin (????-2005 and 2009 Chinese National Games)
  Ju Genyin (2005–2010)
  Wang Jian (2010–2012)
  Lyu Ningxin (2012–2014)
  Shen Qiong (2014–)

See also
Shanghai women's volleyball team
Chinese Volleyball Super League
Beijing BAIC Motor Men's Volleyball Team

References

Chinese volleyball clubs
Sport in Shanghai
Men's volleyball teams